The Fiji snake (Ogmodon vitianus), also known as the Bolo snake, is a species of snake in the family Elapidae. It is monotypic within the genus Ogmodon. It is endemic to Fiji, found only on the island of Viti Levu, and is strongly subterranean.

Sources
 Fijian Burrowing Snake (bolo), Ogmodon vitianus.

References

Elapidae
Reptiles of Fiji
Reptiles described in 1864
Taxa named by Wilhelm Peters
Taxonomy articles created by Polbot